Alberta City, sometimes shortened as "the ABC" by locals, is the name of a suburban area of Tuscaloosa, Alabama, United States. Alberta City is located in the northeastern portion of Tuscaloosa and is generally defined as encompassing the portions of the city east of U.S. Route 82 (McFarland Boulevard), west of Holt, south of the Black Warrior River and north of Veterans Memorial Parkway.

History
With its founding in 1912 and much of its early development tracing to the early 20th Century, what is present-day Alberta City was annexed into Tuscaloosa on September 21, 1948.

On April 27, 2011, Alberta City suffered the heaviest damage from a tornado that destroyed 12% of greater Tuscaloosa, including residences, churches, and stores. The suburb's landscape was changed significantly as numerous properties, homes, and businesses were completely destroyed and left as flat vacant lots after demolitions. Two police stations, a postal office, and elementary, middle, and primary day care schools were all damaged beyond repair or destroyed. Alberta City has undergone slow, gradual reconstruction ever since, largely due to revitalization efforts from the Tuscaloosa city government and from private investors and businesses seeing potential in the area due to its close proximity to the University of Alabama's main campus. 

By 2021, reconstruction remained gradual as some commercial and residential sections of Alberta City remained in visible urban decay due to minimal private investment and negligent property development on the many vacant lots. Continued public investment and the presence of anchor stores have facilitated recovery efforts.

Demographics
Alberta City never reported a population separately as an unincorporated community on the U.S. Census according to the census returns from 1850 until its annexation into Tuscaloosa in 1948.

Infrastructure

Transportation
The neighborhood is serviced by both Alabama State Route 215 (University Boulevard) and U.S. Route 82 (McFarland Boulevard). Public transportation is provided via public bus serviced by the Tuscaloosa Transit Authority's Holt Route.

See also
Cottondale, Alabama — an adjacent unincorporated community in Tuscaloosa County
Holt, Alabama — a nearby unincorporated community in Tuscaloosa County

References

Neighborhoods in Alabama
Tuscaloosa, Alabama
Populated places established in 1912
1912 establishments in Alabama